GMQ or gmq may refer to:

 GMQ, the IATA code for Golog Maqin Airport, Qinghai, China
 gmq, the ISO 639-5 code for North Germanic languages, Northern Europe